This is a list of national birds, including official birds of overseas territories and other states described as nations. Most species in the list are officially designated. Some species hold only an "unofficial" status.

National birds

See also
 List of Australian bird emblems
 List of Indian state birds
 List of U.S. state birds
 List of U.S. county birds
 List of official city birds
 List of national animals

References

N
 
Birds